Paramonovius nightking is a species of bee fly in the family Bombyliidae that is endemic to a restricted area of western Australia. It is the only member of the monotypic genus Paramonovius. Based on morphology, it is the sister genus to Sisyromyia.

This species is unique for presumably being active only during the winter season, as that is the only time that this species was recorded. This unusual flight time may have contributed to this species being so rare in collections. The specific epithet, nightking, references the Night King from the American fantasy drama Game of Thrones as a reference to these habits.

References

Bombyliidae genera
Monotypic insect genera
Insects of Australia
Insects described in 2018
Endemic fauna of Australia
Game of Thrones